Lexa, a Brazilian singer, songwriter, and dancer, has released two studio albums, two extended plays, and seven singles. 

Lexa's first single, Posso Ser, was released in December 2014. It was featured on Brazil Hot 100 Airplay's Top 30 Singles.   

Posso Ser became the title track of Lexa's debut Extended Play (EP) album, released in March 2015. The album contained four songs, including "Posso Ser". The same album was re-released in April 2015 with the bonus track "Delete".   

Lexa released her first studio album on September 18, 2015. The album had 13 tracks, including all five songs from the EP.

Albums

Studio albums

EPs

Singles

As lead artist in songs

Other charted songs

Music videos

References

External links
 Official website
 

Discographies of Brazilian artists
Pop music discographies
Discography
Latin music discographies